Dragoslav D. Šiljak is Professor Emeritus of Electrical Engineering at Santa Clara University, where he held the title of Benjamin and Mae Swig University Professor. He is best known for developing the mathematical theory and methods for control of complex dynamic systems characterized by large-scale, information structure constraints and uncertainty.

Biography 
Šiljak was born on September 10, 1933 in Belgrade, Serbia to Dobrilo and Ljubica (née Živanović). He earned his Bachelor's degree from the School of Electrical Engineering at the University of Belgrade in the field of Automatic Control Systems in 1957. By 1963, he had received both his Master's and Ph.D. degrees under the supervision of Professor Dušan Mitrović; and he was appointed Docent Professor in that same year. At the Belgrade University 
he sought out books in Russian mathematical maestros like Lyapunov, Pontryagin, and Krasovsky. He also managed -- as a graduate student -- to get pappers published in the top U.S. journal in control engineering.

His published papers, however, caught the attention of U.S. academics, including G.J. Thaler, a lecturer at Santa Clara University who convinced the Dean of Engineering Robert Parden to extend an invitation to Šiljak. He arrived on the Mission Campus in 1964 to teach and conduct research. There he taught courses in Electrical Engineering and Applied Mathematics, and developed methods for the design of control systems.  In 1967, Šiljak married Dragana (née Todorovic). They have two children, Ana and Matija, and five grandchildren.

Research 
In 1964, Šiljak was awarded a multi-year grant from the National Aeronautics and Space Administration (NASA) to apply parameter space methods for the design of robust control systems to space structures. He collaborated with Sherman Selzer in the Astrionics Laboratory of NASA's George C. Marshall Space Flight Center to design the navigation and control systems for the Saturn V Large Booster that propelled the 1969 Apollo 11 lunar mission. He then began to develop his theory of stability and control of large-scale systems, based on graph-theoretic methods and vector Lyapunov Functions. He applied the theory to the decentralized control of the Large Space Telescope and Skylab built by NASA.

In the early 1970s, Šiljak considered large-scale dynamic systems composed of interconnected sub-systems with uncertain interconnections. He defined the concept of "connective stability": a system is considered stable when it remains stable despite the disconnection and re-connection of subsystems during operation. He established the methods for determining the conditions for connective stability within the framework of comparison principle and vector Lyapunov functions. He applied these methods to a wide variety of models, including large space structures, competitive equilibrium in multi-market systems, multi-species communities in population biology, and large scale power systems.

In the 1980s, Šiljak and his collaborators developed a large number of new and highly original concepts and methods for the decentralized control of uncertain large-scale interconnected systems. He introduced new notions of overlapping sub-systems and decompositions  to formulate the inclusion principle. The principle described the process of expansion and contraction of dynamic systems that serve the purpose of rewriting overlapping decompositions as disjoint, which, in turn, allows the standard methods for control design. Structurally fixed modes, multiple controllers for reliable stabilization, decentralized optimization, and hierarchical, epsilon, and overlapping decompositions laid the foundation for a powerful and efficient approach to a broad set of problems in control design of large complex systems. This development was reported in a comprehensive monograph Decentralized Control of Complex Systems

In the following two decades, Šiljak and his collaborators raised the research on complex systems to a higher level. Decomposition schemes involving inputs and outputs were developed for and applied to complex systems of unprecedented dimensions. Dynamic graphs were defined in a linear space as one parameter groups of transformations of the graph space into itself. This new mathematical entity opened the possibility to include continuous Boolean networks in a theoretical study of gene regulation and modeling of large-scale organic structures. These new and exciting developments were published in Control of Complex Systems: Structural Constraints and Uncertainty.

In 2004, a special issue in his honor was published in two numbers of the mathematical journal Dynamics of Continuous, Discrete, and Impulsive System, and it contained articles from leading scholars in the field of dynamic systems. A survey of the selected works of Dragoslav Šiljak can be found in "An Overview of the Collected Works of Dragoslav Siljak" by Zoran Gajić and Masao Ikeda, published in Dynamics of Continuous, Discrete and Impulsive Systems Series A: Mathematical Analysis.

Awards 
In 1981, Šiljak served as a Distinguished Scholar of the Japan Society for Promotion of Science.  In that same year he became a Fellow of the Institute of Electrical and Electronics Engineers (IEEE), "for contributions to the theory of nonlinear control and large-scale systems". He was selected as a Distinguished Professor of the Fulbright Foundation in 1984, and in 1985 became an International Member of the Serbian Academy of Arts and Sciences. In 1986, he served as a Director of the NSF Workshop “Challenges to Control: A Collective View,” organizing a forum of top control scientists at Santa Clara University for the purpose of assessing the state of the art of the field and outlining directions of research. In 1991, he gave a week-long seminar on decentralized control at the Seoul National University as a Hoam Distinguished Foreign Scholar. In 2001, he became a Life Fellow of the IEEE.

In 2010 he received the Richard E. Bellman Control Heritage Award from the American Automatic Control Council, "for his fundamental contributions to the theory of large-scale systems, decentralized control, and parametric approach to robust stability".

Sports career 
Šiljak was a member of the national water polo team of Yugoslavia that won the silver medal at the 1952 Olympic Games in Helsinki, Finland. He was again a member of the team when it won the World Cup “Trofeo Italia” played in Nijmegen, The Netherlands, in 1953. Šiljak played water polo for the club “Jadran“ of Hercegnovi when the club won The National Championship of Yugoslavia in 1958 and 1959.  He was a member of the club “Partizan," Belgrade when the club won the Yugoslav Championship in 1963 and became the “Champion of Champions” by winning the Tournament of European Water Polo Champions in Zagreb, Croatia, in 1964.

Works 
Books

 Nonlinear Systems: The Parameter Analysis and Design, John Wiley (1969)
 Large-Scale Dynamic Systems: Stability and Structure, North-Holland (1978)
 Decentralized Control of Complex Systems, Academic Press (1991), published in Russian as Децентрализованное управление сложными системами, Mir (1994).
Control of Complex Systems: Structural Constraints and Uncertainty, Springer Verlag (2010, with A. I. Zečević)
Dragoslav Šiljak, Stablinost sistema upravljanja (The Stability of Control Systems), Elektrotehniĉki fakultet u Beogradu (1974)

Select Articles

 "Connective Stability of Complex Ecosystems," Nature (1974).
 "Connective Stability of Competitive Equilibrium," Automatica (1975).
 "Competitive Economic Systems: Stability, Decomposition, and Aggregation," IEEE Transactions on Automatic Control (1976).
 "An Improved Block-Parallel Newton Method via Epsilon Decompositions for Load Flow Calculations," IEEE Transactions on Power Systems (1978).
 "Lotka-Volterra Equations: Decomposition, Stability, and Structure," Journal of Mathematical Biology (1980) (with M. Ikeda).
 "Structurally Fixed Modes," Systems and Control Letters (1981).
 "Decentralized Control with Overlapping Information Sets," Journal of Optimization Theory and Applications (1981).
 "An Inclusion Principle for Hereditary Systems," Journal of Mathematical Analysis and Applications (1984). 
 "Nested Epsilon Decompositions of Linear Systems: Weakly Coupled and Overlapping Blocks," SIAM Journal on Matrix Analysis and Applications (1991).
 "Optimal Decentralized Control for Stochastic Dynamic Systems," Recent Trends in Optimization Theory and Applications (1995).
 "Coherency Recognition Using Epsilon Decomposition," IEEE Transactions on Power Systems (1998).
"Dynamic Graphs," Nonlinear Analysis: Hybrid Systems (2008).
 "Inclusion Principle for Descriptor Systems," IEEE Transactions on Automatic Control (2009).
"Consensus at Competitive Equilibrium: Dynamic Flow of Autonomous Cars in Traffic Networks" (2017).

External links 

 IFAC Biography
 Collected Works of Professor Dragoslav Siljak

References

Control theorists
American electrical engineers
Serbian engineers
American people of Serbian descent
Living people
Fellow Members of the IEEE
Richard E. Bellman Control Heritage Award recipients
1933 births